Trachycladidae is a family of sea sponges in the subclass Heteroscleromorpha. It is the only family in the monotypic order Trachycladida.

Genera
 Rhaphidhistia Carter, 1879
 Trachycladus Carter, 1879

References

External links
 

Heteroscleromorpha
Sponge families